Taenarthrus is a genus of ground beetles in the family Carabidae. There are about 13 described species in Taenarthrus, found in New Zealand.

Species
These 13 species belong to the genus Taenarthrus:

 Taenarthrus aenigmaticus Johns, 2010
 Taenarthrus aquatilis Johns, 2010
 Taenarthrus capito (Jeannel, 1938)
 Taenarthrus curvispinatus Johns, 2010
 Taenarthrus gelidimontanus Johns, 2010
 Taenarthrus latispinatus Johns, 2010
 Taenarthrus lissus Johns, 2010
 Taenarthrus minor Johns, 2010
 Taenarthrus obliteratus Johns, 2010
 Taenarthrus pakinius Johns, 2010
 Taenarthrus philpotti Broun, 1914
 Taenarthrus pluriciliatus Johns, 2010
 Taenarthrus ruaumokoi Johns, 2010

References

External links

 

Migadopinae